Park Jae-hong (Hangul: 박재홍; born 10 November 1978) is a retired South Korean football player.

Club career
He played domestically for Sangmu (while on military service), Jeonbuk Hyundai Motors, Chunnam Dragons and Gyeongnam, as well as for Romanian club Universitatea Cluj (where he went to play alongside fellow South Korean Kim Jong-chun, thus becoming the first foreign footballers in the club's history), Chinese club Jiangsu Sainty and Thai club INSEE Police United.

Honours
Jeonbuk Hyundai Motors
FA Cup: 2003
Korean Super Cup: 2004
Chunnam Dragons
FA Cup: 2006
Universitatea Cluj
Liga II: 2006–07
Gyeongnam
FA Cup runner-up: 2008

References

External links

National Team Player Record 

1978 births
Living people
Association football defenders
South Korean footballers
South Korean expatriate footballers
South Korea international footballers
Gimcheon Sangmu FC players
Jeonbuk Hyundai Motors players
Jeonnam Dragons players
FC Universitatea Cluj players
Gyeongnam FC players
Jiangsu F.C. players
Chinese Super League players
K League 1 players
Liga I players
Liga II players
Expatriate footballers in Romania
South Korean expatriate sportspeople in China
Expatriate footballers in China
South Korean expatriate sportspeople in Romania
Expatriate footballers in Thailand
South Korean expatriate sportspeople in Thailand
Footballers at the 2000 Summer Olympics
2000 CONCACAF Gold Cup players
2000 AFC Asian Cup players
2004 AFC Asian Cup players
Olympic footballers of South Korea
Footballers from Seoul
Park Jae-hong
Myongji University alumni